Adèle Daminois, real name Angélique Adèle Huvey, (21 December 1789 – 5 March 1876) was a French female novelist and playwright. She was Maria Du Fresnay's mother as well as Marie-Caroline Du Fresnay's and Ange Du Fresnay's grandmother.

She is known for her many articles in favor of the emancipation of women and their admission to jobs and honors  as well as for her lectures at the Athénée des Arts. She authored novels of manners.

Works 
1819: Léontine de Werteling, 2 vols.
1819: Maria
1821: Alfred et Zaïda, 3 vols.
1823: Mareska et Oscar, 4 vols.
1823: La Chasse au renard, vaudeville in 1 act, with Amable de Saint-Hilaire
1824: Lydie, ou la Créole, 3 vols.
1825: Charles, ou le Fils naturel, 4 vols.
1826: Alaïs, ou la Vierge de Ténédos, short story
1827: Mes souvenirs, ou Choix d'anecdotes
1832: Une mosaïque, 2 vols.
1834: Le Prisonnier de Gisors
1836: Le Cloître au XIXème siècle
1838: Une âme d'enfer

Bibliography 
 Gustave Vapereau, Dictionnaire universel des contemporains, 1870, (p. 474) (Read online)
 Camille Dreyfus, André Berthelot, La Grande encyclopédie, vol.13, 1886, (p. 812)
 Cecilia Beach, French Women Playwrights Before the Twentieth Century, 1994, (p. 100)
 Martine Reid, Des femmes en littérature, 2010, (p. 328)

References 

19th-century French novelists
19th-century French dramatists and playwrights
French women dramatists and playwrights
French women novelists
French feminists
People from Oise
1789 births
1876 deaths
19th-century French women writers
19th-century women writers